The Big Life is a British ska musical with book and lyrics by Paul Sirett and music by Paul Joseph, originally produced by the Theatre Royal Stratford East in 2004. It combines Shakespeare's Love's Labours Lost with the story of the Windrush immigrants  (those Jamaicans who arrived in Britain aboard the MV Empire Windrush in 1948, which began an era of multiculturalism).

The musical transferred to the West End's Apollo Theatre in 2005. It was nominated for Best New Musical at the 2006 Olivier Awards.

References 

West End musicals
British musicals
2004 musicals